Derek Smith (born October 1, 1980, in Silver Grove, Kentucky) is an athlete who has played American football and basketball. He played for the Highlands Bluebirds under head coach Dale Mueller. Smith, a tight end, and quarterback Jared Lorenzen, formerly of the New York Giants, led Highlands to two Kentucky class 3A state championships. In a single game against rival Scott High School, Smith caught 7 passes for 325 yards and 5 receiving touchdowns, which is still a KHSAA state record.

Derek went on to play three years for the University of Kentucky Wildcats, where he set many school and SEC records for a tight end. Smith left Kentucky after three years to enter the NFL Draft. Listed at 6'4" , Smith signed with the Indianapolis Colts practice squad and later signed with the St. Louis Rams and the Cincinnati Bengals.

After he was released by the Bengals, Smith went back to college at Northern Kentucky University where he played basketball for the Norse in 2004.

References

1980 births
People from Campbell County, Kentucky
Living people
American football tight ends
Kentucky Wildcats football players
Indianapolis Colts players
Cincinnati Bengals players